Hong Cha-Ok (Hangul: 홍차옥, Hanja: 洪次玉) (born March 10, 1970 in Gunwi County, Gyeongsangbuk-do, South Korea) is a former female table tennis player from South Korea who competed in the 1988 Summer Olympics and the 1992 Summer Olympics. She was a member of the Korea Unified team for the 1991 World Table Tennis Championships in Chiba City, Japan.

References

External links
profile

1970 births
Living people
South Korean female table tennis players
Table tennis players at the 1988 Summer Olympics
Table tennis players at the 1992 Summer Olympics
Olympic table tennis players of South Korea
Olympic bronze medalists for South Korea
Olympic medalists in table tennis
Asian Games medalists in table tennis
Table tennis players at the 1990 Asian Games
Medalists at the 1992 Summer Olympics
Asian Games gold medalists for South Korea
Asian Games silver medalists for South Korea
Asian Games bronze medalists for South Korea
Medalists at the 1990 Asian Games
Sportspeople from North Gyeongsang Province
20th-century South Korean women